Nøstvik Church or Velfjord Church is a parish church of the Church of Norway in Brønnøy Municipality in Nordland county, Norway. It is located in the village of Hommelstø in the Velfjord area of the municipality. It is the main church for the Velfjord og Tosen parish which is part of the Sør-Helgeland prosti (deanery) in the Diocese of Sør-Hålogaland. The red, wooden church was built in a cruciform style in 1674. The church seats about 270 people.

History
The earliest existing historical records of the church date back to the year 1589, but the church was not new that year. The first church on this site was a stave church that may have been built in the 14th century. In 1674, the small church was torn down and in its place, a new church was built. The new building was a timber-framed cruciform church with narrow transverse arms on each side of the nave and a narrower choir in the east. At the east end of the chancel there is a sacristy and at the west end of the nave there is a tower on the roof.

See also
List of churches in Sør-Hålogaland

References

Brønnøy
Churches in Nordland
Wooden churches in Norway
Cruciform churches in Norway
17th-century Church of Norway church buildings
Churches completed in 1674
14th-century establishments in Norway